The Armenian national movement ( Hay azgayin-azatagrakan sharzhum) included social, cultural, but primarily political and military movements that reached their height during World War I and the following years, initially seeking improved status for Armenians in the Ottoman and Russian Empires but eventually attempting to achieve an Armenian state.

Influenced by the Age of Enlightenment and the rise of nationalism under the Ottoman Empire, the Armenian national movement developed in the early 1860s. Its emergence was similar to that of movements in the Balkan nations, especially the Greek revolutionaries who fought the Greek War of Independence. The Armenian élite and various militant groups sought to defend the mostly rural  Christian Armenian population of the eastern Ottoman Empire from banditry and abuses by Muslims, but the ultimate goal was to push for reforms in the six Armenian-populated vilayets of the Ottoman Empire at first and after this failed, the creation of an Armenian state in the Armenian-populated areas controlled at the time by the Ottoman Empire and the Russian Empire.

Starting in the late 1880s, the movement engaged in guerrilla warfare against the Ottoman government and Kurdish irregulars in the eastern regions of the empire, led by the three Armenian political parties named the Social Democrat Hunchakian Party, the Armenakan Party and the Armenian Revolutionary Federation. Armenians generally saw Russia as their natural ally in the fight against Turks although Russia maintained an oppressive policy in the Caucasus. Only after losing its presence in Europe after the Balkan Wars, the Ottoman government was forced to sign the Armenian reform package in early 1914, however it was disrupted by World War I.

During World War I, the Armenians living in the Ottoman Empire were systematically exterminated by the government in the Armenian genocide. According to some estimates, from 1894 to 1923, about 1,500,000—2,000,000 Armenians were killed by the Ottoman Empire. After the decision to exterminate the Armenians was taken by the Ottoman Ministry of Interior and first implemented with the Directive 8682 on February 25, 1915, tens of thousands of Russian Armenians joined the Russian army as Armenian volunteer units with a Russian promise for autonomy. By 1917, Russia controlled many Armenian-populated areas of the Ottoman Empire. After the October Revolution, however, the Russian troops retreated and left the Armenians irregulars one on one with the Turks. The Armenian National Council proclaimed the Republic of Armenia on May 28, 1918, thus establishing an Armenian state in the Armenian-populated parts of the Southern Caucasus.

By 1920, the Bolshevik Government in Russia and Ankara Government had successfully come to power in their respective countries. Turkish forces had successfully occupied the western half of Armenia, while the Red Army invaded and annexed the Republic of Armenia in December 1920. A friendship treaty was signed between Bolshevik Russia and Kemalist Turkey in 1921. The formerly Russian-controlled parts of Armenia were mostly annexed by the Soviet Union, in parts of which the Armenian Soviet Socialist Republic was established. Hundreds of thousands of genocide refugees found themselves in the Middle East, Greece, France and the US giving start to a new era of the Armenian diaspora. Soviet Armenia existed until 1991, when the Soviet Union disintegrated and the current (Third) Republic of Armenia was established.

Origins 

Nationalism was an important factor in the development of Europe. In the 19th century, a wave of romantic nationalism swept the continent of Europe transforming the countries of the continent. Some new countries, such as Germany and Italy were formed by uniting smaller states with a common "national identity". Others, such as Romania, Greece, Poland and Bulgaria, were formed by winning their independence. Armenians were living among Ottoman Empire and Russian Empire during the rise of nationalism. In 1827–1828, Tsar Nicholas I in the Russo-Persian War (1826–1828) sought help from Armenians, promising that after the war, their lives would improve. In 1828, Russia annexed Yerevan, Nakhichevan, and the surrounding countryside with the Treaty of Turkmenchay. Armenians still living under Persian rule were encouraged to emigrate to Russian Armenia and 30,000 followed the call. In 1828, the Russians declared war and in the Treaty of Adrianople, Akhalkalak and Akhaltsikhe exchanged to Russia. There was a new wave of immigration as 25,000 Ottoman Armenians moved to Russian Armenia. Russia annexed significant portion of the Armenians. In 1897 Russian Census stated that 1,127,212 Armenians were in the Russian Lands (Erivan, 439,926; Elizavetpol, 298,790; Kars	72,967, Tiflis, 230,379, Baku, 52,770; Chernomorsk, 6,223 Daghestan, 1,652, Kutais, 24,505).  At the same period (1896 Vital Cuinet) Armenians in the Ottoman Empire were 1,095,889 (Adana Vilayet, 97,450 Aleppo Vilayet, 37,999; Ankara Vilayet, 94,298; Bitlis Vilayet, 131,300; Bursa Vilayet, 88,991; Diyâr-ı Bekr Vilayet	67,718; Erzurum Vilayet, 134,967; İzmir Vilayet, 15,105; İzmit, 48,655; Kastamonu Vilayet, 2,647; Mamure-ul-Azil Vilayet, 79,128; Sivas Vilayet, 170,433; Trebizond Vilayet, 47,20; Van Vilayet, 79,998) There were many Armenians familiar with Russian customs. Russia, for Armenians, was also a path to Europe.

In 1836, Russifican, Russian cultural advances included “limited” Russian reforms. Russia targeted the Armenian Church. Russia curtailed the Church's advances in the society.

In 1839, attempting to stem the tide of nationalist movements within the Ottoman Empire, Tanzimât period emerged from the minds of reformist sultans like Mahmud II and Abdülmecid I as well as prominent reformers who were European-educated bureaucrats. Tanzimat included the policy of Ottomanism, which was meant to unite all of the different peoples living in Ottoman territories, "Muslim and non-Muslim, Turkish and Greek, Armenian and Jewish, Kurd and Arab". For this purpose, Islamic law was put aside in favour of secular law. This policy officially began with the Imperial Rescript of the Rose Chamber of 1839, declaring equality before the law for both Muslim and non-Muslim Ottomans.

In 1863, Ottoman Armenians were introduced to a set of major reforms as an extension of Tanzimat. The Armenian National Constitution (150 articles drafted by Nahapet Rusinian, Servichen, Nigoghos Balian, Krikor Odian and Krikor Margosian) defined the condition of Armenians in the Ottoman Empire, but also introduced regulations defining the authority of the Patriarch. The constitution of the Armenian National Assembly was seen as a milestone by progressive Armenians. A second development was the introduction of elementary education, colleges and other institutions of learning by Protestant missionaries.  Communications improved with the starting of Armenian newspapers.  Books about Armenian history enabled a comparison of the past with current conditions and expanded readers' horizons. This was part of an evolution in Armenian political consciousness from purely cultural romanticism to a programme for action.

1860 and onward, the number of Armenian schools, philanthropic and patriotic organizations multiplied in the Ottoman Empire. The initial aim of Protestant missionaries were the conversion of the Muslims and Jews, but soon they became involved with Protestant Reformation of the Orthodox Armenians. The Armenian subjects of the Empire influenced by the Armenian Diaspora, the network of congregations and schools of the Protestant missionaries throughout the Ottoman Empire begin to rethink their position in the world. In 1872, the journalist Grigor Ardzruni from Ottoman Empire said “Yesterday we were an ecclesiastical community, today we are patriots, tomorrow we will be a nation of workers and thinkers.” A parallel development occurred in Russian Armenia. Before 1840, Armenian journals were mainly in the hands of the clergy. This was changed. Along with the schools, the press played an important educational role and pointed the way to insurrection. From the first day when Rev. William Goodell settled in Constantinople in 1831 to the end of World War I, the missionaries made considerable contributions to the education of Armenians. The European intellectual currents such as ideas of the French Revolution were transmitted through the 23,000 Armenian students within 127 Protestant congregations with 13,000 communicants, and 400 schools.

In the 1880s, after the Russian defeat in the Crimean War in 1856 and the Polish rebellion of 1861, Tsar Alexander II increased Russification to reduce the threat of future rebellions (Russia was populated by many minority groups). Tsar Alexander II attempted to prevent self-determinationistic tendencies and separatism. Armenian language, schools were targeted. Russia wanted to replace with Russian schools and Russian educational materials.

National Revival 

The discovery of Urartu has come to play a significant role in 19th and 20th-century Armenian nationalism.

Kagik Ozanyan claims that Tanzimat regulations, helped the formation of an Armenian political strata and incited the Armenian national spirit, which was aligned with the nation building through revolution aligned with the French Revolution perspective. The Russian Consul General to Ottoman Empire, General Mayewski, recorded the following 

The development of ideas of nationalism, salvation and independence, established during the late 19th century, along with the other national movements, as a nascent Armenian intelligentsia promoted the use of these new concepts in society with a particularly an Armenian import. The first wave of these concepts were developed by an Armenian intelligentsia which had studied in Western Europe under the influence of the French Revolution (1789). They were espoused a democratic-liberal ideology and the concept of the rights of man. The second wave come with the emergence of Russian revolutionary thought. At the end of the 19th century, the movement was based on a socialist ideology, specifically in its Marxist variant, specifically ARF. There was a major problem, the materialism and class struggle (Marxist variant) did not directly apply to the socioeconomics of Armenians in the Ottoman Empire as much as to those in the Russian Armenia that had already achieved the Industrial Revolution.

Armenian majority 
A basic form of "majority" is (consisting of more than half of a regions elements) or a plurality, (larger than any other group) considered for establishing a form governance (or a state). the Six vilayets or Six provinces were presented as the Armenian-populated vilayets (provinces) of the Ottoman Empire, while Erivan and Kars provinces were the main Armenian-populated provinces on the Russian side.

Founding 

The development of ideas of nationalism, salvation and independence, established during the late 19th century, gathered momentum with the establishment of Armenian Revolutionary Federation, Social Democrat Hunchakian Party and Armenakan (later named as Ramgavar). The organized Armenian activities traced back to first known Armenian group, the "Union of Salvation," before the three major groups established themselves.

On March 3, 1872, 46 Armenians came together to build “Union of Salvation (Armenian)” (different from the Russian Union of Salvation). The organization declared “Gone is our honor; our churches have been violated; they kidnapped our brides and our youth; they have taken away our rights and try to exterminate our nation..”  On April 26, 1872, villages around Van send a request “In order to save ourselves from these evils, we are prepared to follow you even if we must shed blood or die. We are ready to go wherever... If the alternative to our present condition is to become Russified, let us be Russified together; if it is to be emigration, let us emigrate; if we are to die, let us die” This organization had not only direct contact with the Russian government but with certain Russian organization. These Russian organizations had goals to liberate the Ottoman Armenians from Ottoman Empire.  Union of Salvation served a major step toward the formation of the first Armenian political party, the Armenakan.

In 1881 Erzurum; Ottoman Armenians educated with the European Way began to make attempts in forming organizations – secret societies - local groups, such as the 'Protectors of the Fatherland' (1881) which was established in Erzurum. Protectors of the Fatherland was almost certainly affected by the ideas of French revolution and Greek Revolution as 'Freedom or Death' was their motto. The protectors of the fatherland was significant Armenian organization. The constitution and the bylaws were memorized as written documents were dangerous. The membership was performed by sponsorship. Members are organized in tens, and only the leader had access to the central committee. After the first couple months in Erzurum membership became in hundreds.

In 1885, the "Armenian Democratic Liberal Party" was established in Van by Mëkërtich Portukalian, who later went into exile in Marseilles but kept in touch with local leaders, and published a journal of political and social enlightenment titled L'Armenie. The Armenians of Van continued to develop the political principles behind Armenian nationalism, in secret. The party's aim soon become to 'win for the Armenians the right to rule themselves, through revolution'. Their view on how to liberate Armenia from the Ottoman Empire was that it should be through the press, national awakening and unarmed resistance.

In 1887, the Social Democrat Hunchakian Party (Hentchak, Hunchak) was the first socialist party in the Ottoman Empire and Persia, founded by Avetis Nazarbekian, Mariam Vardanian, Gevorg Gharadjian, Ruben Khan-Azat, Christopher Ohanian, Gabriel Kafian and Manuel Manuelian, a group of college students who met in Geneva, Switzerland, with the goal to gain Armenia's independence from the Ottoman Empire. Hunchak means "Bell" in English, and was taken by party members to represent "awakening, enlightenment, and freedom." It was also the name of the party's main newspaper.

In 1889 the Young Armenia Society was founded by Kristapor Mikayelian in Tbilisi. The Young Armenia Society organised Fedayee campaigns into Ottoman territory. The Young Armenia Society an armed expedition to Ottoman Armenia with the Gugunian Expedition. Its aims were the carrying out reprisals against Kurds persecuting Armenians in the Ottoman Empire. The society believed that the Russians would assist in the creation of an autonomous Armenian province under Russian rule.

In 1890 the Armenian Revolutionary Federation (“ARF” or Dashnaktsutiun) was founded in Tiflis. Its members armed themselves into fedayee groups to defend Armenian villages from widespread oppression, attacks and persecution of the Armenians. It being seen as the only solution to save the people from Ottoman oppression and massacres. its initial aim was to guarantee reforms in the Armenian provinces and to gain eventual autonomy.

During 1880-1890 the local communication channels were developed. The organizations were fully functional under Ankara, Amasya, Çorum, Diyarbakır, Yozgat, and Tokat. In 1893 they began to use wall newspapers (newspapers like billboards) directed toward the non Armenian subjects.  The main theme of these materials were people should take control of their own life against the oppressors. These ideological communicants did not have any effect on the Muslims. These activities ended with clashes between revolutionaries and Ottoman police. Generally resulted with the jail time. Sultan panicked, and local authorities act against them as they were cutting telegraph wires, bombing the odd government buildings. Britain or European powers concluded that however if there would be more interference these would end with religious fanaticism, and a civil war (massacres) would occur.

Notable figures 

The partisan movement was established by these leaders.

 ARF: Stepan Zorian, Christapor Mikaelian, Simon Zavarian
 Armenakan: Mekertich Portukalian
 Hentchak: Avetis Nazarbekian, Mariam Vardanian, Gevorg Gharadjian, Ruben Khan-Azat, Christopher Ohanian, Gabriel Kafian and Manuel Manuelian

There were many notables besides the "founding leaders" listed. The classifications given below refer to the titles for which they are mostly remembered today. They served in multiple duties and ranks.
 Aram Manukian, "key figure", politician, general.
 Andranik Ozanian, "key figure", military commander, fedayee leader
 Drastamat Kanayan, "key figure"
 Karekin Pastermadjian,  "key figure," politician , military commander, fedayee leader
 Aghbiur Serob, military commander
 Arabo, fedayee leader
 Sose Mayrig, fedayee leader
 Garegin Nzhdeh, politician, military commander
 Kevork Chavush, fedayee leader
 Sebastatsi Murad, fedayee leader
 Paramaz, fedayee,  political activist
 Armenak Yekarian, fedayee leader,  political activist
 Panos Terlemezian, fedayee leader
 Krikor Amirian
 Alexander Khatisian, politician, journalist
 Hovhannes Katchaznouni,  political activist, politician
 Simon Vratsian, political activist, politician
 Movses Silikyan, military commander,
 Hovsep Aivazian, key figure", military commander, fedayee leader

The Church 

Armenian nationalism and Armenian religion (the Armenian Apostolic Church, a non-Chalcedonian church, which is also the world's oldest national church) is intertwined.

The main voices of the movement were secular, as close to the turn of the century, Massis (published in the capitol), the Hiusissapile and Ardzvi Vaspurkan (published in the Van) became the main national organs (journals).  These publications were secular. Major Armenian writers of the era, Mikael Nalbandian and Raphael Patkanian can be counted among the influential.

Beginning with 1863, Armenian Patriarch of Constantinople began to share his powers with the Armenian National Assembly and his powers were limited by the Armenian National Constitution. He perceived the changes as erosion of his community. Armenian religious leaders played a key roles in the revolutionary movement. The Patriarch of Constantinople Mkrtich Khrimian was an important figure. Mkrtich Khrimian transferred to Jerusalem in his later years, although this was actually an exile.

Great Powers, Russo-Turkish War 

Beginning in the mid-19th century, the Great Powers took issue with the Empire's treatment of its Christian minorities and increasingly pressured extend equal rights to all its citizens. Following the violent suppression of Christians in the uprisings in Bosnia and Herzegovina, Bulgaria and Serbia in 1875, the Great Powers invoked the 1856 Treaty of Paris by claiming that it gave them the right to intervene and protect the Ottoman Empire's Christian minorities. By the late 1870s, the Greeks, along with several other Christian nations in the Balkans, frustrated with their conditions, had, with the help of the Powers, broken free of Ottoman rule. The Armenians, on the other hand, received less interest and no support that wasn't later withdrawn from the Great Powers and remained, by and large, stagnant during these years, earning them the title of 'millet-i sadika' or the "loyal millet".

Armenian position changed as an intellectual class began to emerge among Armenian society. At the same time, the Armenian patriarchate of Constantinople, Nerses II of Constantinople (1874–1884), forwarded Armenian complaints of widespread "forced land seizure ... forced conversion of women and children, arson, protection extortion, rape, and murder" to the Powers. March 1878, after the conclusion of the 1877–78 Russo-Turkish War, the Armenians began to look more toward the Russian Empire as the ultimate guarantors of their security. Patriarch Nerses Varjabedyan approached the Russian leadership during the negotiations with the Ottomans in San Stefano and convinced them to insert a clause, Article 16 to Treaty of San Stefano, stipulating that the Russian forces occupying the Armenian-populated provinces in the eastern Ottoman Empire would withdraw only with the full implementation of reforms.

June 1878, Great Britain was troubled with Russia's holding on to so much Ottoman territory in the "Treaty of San Stefano" and forced the parties for a new negotiations with the convening of the Congress of Berlin. The Article 61 of the Treaty of Berlin contained the same text as Article 16 but removed any mention that Russian forces would remain in the provinces. Instead, the Ottoman government was periodically to inform the Great Powers of the progress of the reforms. The Armenian National Assembly and Patriarch Nerses II of Constantinople sent Catholicos Mgrdich Khrimian to present the case for the Armenians at Berlin; in his famous patriotic speech (following the Berlin negotiations) “The Paper Ladle,” Mgrdich Khrimian advised Armenians to take the national awakening of Bulgaria (Liberation of Bulgaria) as a model as the hopes for self-determination were ignored by the European community of nations. In Bulgarian historiography, Liberation of Bulgaria means the events of the Russo-Turkish War of 1877-78 that led to the re-establishment of Bulgarian Sovereign state with the Treaty of San Stefano.

In 1880 Armenians especially encouraged by the prime minister Gladstone touched the Armenian issue with the words “To serve Armenia is to serve the Civilization. June 11, 1880, The great powers sent to porte an “Identic Note” which asked for the enforcement of the article 61. This followed on January 2, 1881, with a British Circular on Armenia to other Powers.

The "Young Armenia Society" believed that the Russians would assist in the creation of an autonomous Armenian province under Russian rule.

The ARF is often accused of having tactics, even today viewed as still being, aimed at convincing Western governments and diplomatic circles to sponsor the party's demands.

The Armenian national movement had discovered through their revolutionary movement that neither Tsar Alexander II with his idealism nor Gladstone's Liberalism was a dependable hope.

Armenian diaspora 

Significant European and American movements began with the Armenian diaspora in France and in the U.S. as early as in the 1890s. The previous Armenian migrations were minor or and had not been statistically significant.

In 1885, the Armenian Patriotic Society of Europe was established in Chesilton Road, Fulham, with its headquarters there. Its goal was that the Armenian diaspora should help those in their native land, both financially and raise Armenian political consciousness about its subject condition. Various political parties and benevolent unions, such as branches for the Armenian Revolutionary Federation, the Social-Democrat Henchagian party, and the Armenian General Benevolent Union (AGBU) which was initially founded in Constantinople, were established wherever there was a considerable number of Armenians.

The Armenian diaspora played a significant role in every stage such as Armenian Revolutionary Federation in diaspora did not forgive what they saw as betrayal of the 'Free, Independent Armenia' (the motto of the party) and campaigned against the Soviet state in a variety of ways.

Activities (Ottoman Empire)

Abdul Hamid II Era 
The emergence of the Armenian Partisan Movement in the early 1880s and the armed struggle by the late 1880s fall into the Sultan Abdul Hamid II's reign. Abdul Hamid II come to rule where he oversaw a period of decline in the power and extent of the Empire. He ruled from 31 August 1876 until he was deposed on 27 April 1909.

Armed movement 
The partisan movement organized around Armenian centers, such that before ARF replaced the Armenakans, Armenakans mainly operated in and around the city of Van. There are advantages to look events using the regions as the groups were organized regional bases.

Capitol 

The Kum Kapu demonstration occurred in the Kumkapı district of Constantinople on July 27, 1890. The cause of the demonstrations were "..to awaken the maltreated Armenians and to make the Sublime Porte fully aware of the miseries of the Armenians." The Hunchaks had come to  a conclusion that the demonstrations at Kum Kapu were unsuccessful. Similar demonstration on a lesser scale followed throughout most of the 1890s.

The 1896 Ottoman Bank Takeover was the seizing of the Ottoman Bank in Constantinople, on 26 August 1896. Bank takeover was planned by members of the ARF. In an effort to raise further awareness and action by the major European powers, 28 armed men and women led primarily by Papken Siuni and Karekin Pastirmaciyan (Armen Karo) took over the bank which largely employed European personnel from Great Britain and France. Stirred largely due to the inaction of the European powers in regards to pogroms and massacres instigated by the Sultan Abdul-Hamid II. The ARF members saw its seizure as their best attempt to bring full attention to the massacres.

The Yıldız assassination attempt was a failed assassination attempted on Sultan Abdul Hamid II by the ARF at Yıldız Mosque on July 21, 1905.

Van/Bitlis Vilayets (Lake Van Region) 

Certain geographical and ethnic factors favored Van as a center.  The lake van is the frontier to Russia and Persia, which assistance from was easily accessible.

In May 1889, Bashkale Resistance was the bloody encounter of three revolutionaries of Armenakan. Bashkale was a town in the Van Province. The comrades Karapet Koulaksizian, Hovhannes Agripasian, and Vardan Goloshian were stopped and demanded that they disarm. On them were two documents addressed to Koulaksizian, one from Avetis Patiguian of London and the other from Mëkërtich Portukalian, in Marseille. Ottoman's believed that the men were members of a large revolutionary apparatus and the discussion was reflected on newspapers, (Eastern Express, Oriental Advertiser, Saadet, and Tarik) and the responses were on the Armenian papers. In some Armenian circles, this event was considered as a martyrdom and brought other armed conflicts.

The Defense of Van was the Armenian population in Van defense against the Ottoman Empire in June, 1896.

The Khanasor Expedition  was the Armenian militia's response on July 25, 1897, to the Defense of Van, where Mazrik tribe ambushed a squad of Armenian defenders and mercilessly slaughtered them.

The Battle of Holy Apostles Monastery was an armed conflict of the Armenian militia in Holy Apostles Monastery near Mush, in November 1901. Andranik Ozanian's intentions were to attract the attention of the foreign consuls at Mush to the plight of the Armenian peasants and to provide a glimmer of hope for the oppressed Armenians of the eastern provinces.

Diyarbekir/Aleppo Vilayets 

Sason was formerly part of the sanjak of Siirt which was in Diyarbakır vilayet of the Ottoman Empire, later part of Batman Province of Turkey. Zeitun was formerly part of the Aleppo Vilayet of the Ottoman Empire, later Süleymanlı in the Kahramanmaraş Province of Turkey. The Social Democrat Hunchakian Party and the ARF were active in the region.

1862 was important for Zeitun. The Armenians of Zeitun had historically enjoyed a period of high autonomy in the Ottoman Empire until the nineteenth century. In the first half of the nineteenth century, the central government decided to bring this region of the empire under tighter control. This strategy ultimately proved ineffective. In the summer of 1862 the Ottomans sent a military contingent of 12,000 men to Zeitun to reassert government control. The force, however, was held at bay by the Armenians and, through French mediation, the first Zeitun resistance was brought to a close. The Zeitun Armenian's gave inspiration to the ideas of creating an Armenian state in Cilicia.

The Sasun resistance of 1894 was the resistance of the Hunchak militia of the Sassoun region. The region continued to be in conflict between the fedayee and the Muslim Ottomans between the local Armenian villages.

Between the years 1891 and 1895, activists from the Armenian Social Democrat Hunchakian Party visited Cilicia, and established a new branch in Zeitun. The Zeitun Rebellion took place in 1895.

In spring 1902, a representative of the ARF, Vahan Manvelyan, was sent to in Sason with the purpose of stopping the insignificant skirmishes, but only irritating the Muslims. In February 1903, Sofia, at the III Congress ARF, it was decided to assign Sason of committee fighting groups. Hrayr Dzhoghk  went to Van where he made organize the Sasun (1902). Alongside Hrayr Dzhoghk was Andranik. Andranik became the main organizer and head of Sasun Uprising of 1904. Hrayr Dzhoghk was killed on April 13 in village Gelieguzan. He was buried in a court of a local church near to Serob Paşa. The Sassoun Uprising was the resistance of the Armenian militia in the Sassoun region.

Armenian reform program 

During 1880 - 1881, while the Armenian national liberation movement was in its early stage; lack of outside support and inability to maintain a trained, organized Kurdish force diminished Kurdish aspirations. However, two prominent Kurdish families (tribes) mounted opposition to the empire, based more from an ethno-nationalistic stand point. The Badr Khans were successionists while the Sayyids of Nihiri were autonomists. The Russo-Turkish War of 1877-78 was followed in 1880 - 1881 by the attempt of Shaykh Ubayd Allah of Nihri to found an "independent Kurd principality" around Ottoman-Persian border (including the Van Vilayet) where Armenian population was significant. Shaykh Ubayd Allah of Nihri gathered 20,000 fighters. Lacking discipline, his man left the ranks after pillaging and acquiring riches from the villages in the region (indiscriminately, including Armenian villages). Shaykh Ubayd Allah of Nihri captured by the Ottoman forces in 1882 and this movement ended.

Security, Reform, Order 

The Kurdish (force, rebels, bandits) sacked neighboring towns and villages with impunity.

The central assumption of the Hamidiye system—Kurdish tribes (Kurdish chiefdoms cited among Armenian security concerns) could be brought under military discipline—proved to be "Utopian". The Persian Cossack Brigade later proved that it can function as independent unit, but Ottoman example, which was modeled after, never replaced the tribal loyalty to Ottoman Sultan or even to its establishing unit.

In 1892, first time a trained and organized Kurdish force encouraged by the Sultan Abdul Hamid II. It was established by and named after Sultan. The Hamidiye corps or Hamidiye Light Cavalry Regiments were well-armed, irregular, majority Kurdish cavalry (minor amounts of other nationalities, such as Turcoman) formations that operated in the eastern provinces of the Ottoman Empire. They were intended to be modeled after the Caucasian Cossack Regiments (example Persian Cossack Brigade) and were firstly tasked to patrol the Russo-Ottoman frontier and secondly, to reduce the potential of Kurdish-Armenian cooperation. The Hamidiye Cavalry was in no way a cross-tribal force, despite their military appearance, organization, and potential. Hamidiye quickly find out that they could only be tried through a military court martial They became immune to civil administration. Realizing their immunity, they turned their tribes into “legalized robber brigades” as they steal grain, reap fields not of their possession, drive off herds, and openly steal from shopkeepers.

Kurdish chieftain also taxed the population of the region in sustaining these units, which Armenian's perceived this Kurdish taxation as an exploitation. When Armenian spokesmen confronted the Kurdish chieftain (issue of double taxation), it brought about enmity between both populations. The Hamidiye cavalry harassed and assaulted Armenians.

In 1908, after the overthrow of Sultan, the Hamidiye Cavalry was disbanded as an organized force, but as they were “tribal forces” before official recognition, they stayed as  “tribal forces” after dismemberment. The Hamidiye Cavalry is described as a military disappointment and a failure because of its contribution to tribal feuds.

Hamidian massacres 

A major role in the Hamidian massacres of 1894–96 has been often ascribed to the Hamidiye regiments, particularly during the bloody suppression of Sasun (1894). On July 25, 1897, the Khanasor Expedition was against the Kurdish Mazrik tribe (Muzuri Kurds) who owned a significant portion of this cavalry.

The Hamidian massacres were brought to an end through mediation by the Great Powers. However instead of Armenian autonomy in these regions, Kurds (Kurdish tribal chiefs) retained much of their autonomy and power. The Abdulhamid made little attempt to alter the traditional power structure of “segmented, agrarian Kurish societies” – agha, shayk, and tribal chief. Because of their geographical position at the southern and eastern fringe of the empire and mountainous topography, and limited transportation and communication system. The state had little access to these provinces and were forced to make informal agreements with tribal chiefs, for instance the Ottoman qadi and mufti did not have jurisdiction over religious law which bolstered Kurdish authority and autonomy.

Abdul Hamid II's position 
Sultan Abdul Hamid II  wanted to reinforce the territorial integrity of the embattled Ottoman Empire, reasserted Pan-Islamism as a state ideology. Abdul Hamid II perceived the Ottoman Armenians to be an extension of foreign hostility, a means by which Europe could "get at our most vital places and tear out our very guts."

Second Constitutional Era 

The Armenians supported the Young Turk Revolution, whose concepts were present in varying proportions among Armenians at the turn of the 20th century

After the revolution, the Ottoman Empire in the Second Constitutional Era was struggling to keep its territories and promoting Ottomanism among its citizens.

ARF, previously outlawed, became the main representative of the Armenian community in the Ottoman Empire, replacing the pre-1908 Armenian elite, which had been composed of merchants, artisans, and clerics who had seen their future in obtaining more privileges within the boundaries of the state's version of Ottomanism.  During the same time the Armenian Revolutionary Federation was moving out of this context and developing, what was just a normal extension of its national freedom concept, the concept of the "Independent Armenian State". With this national transformation ARF's activities become a national cause. ARF, in the early 20th century was socialists, and marxist which can be seen from the party's first program.

Armed movement

Van/Bitlis Vilayets (Lake Van Region) 
At the 1907 Battle of Sulukh, Kevork Chavush was critically wounded on May 25, 1907, during a large firefight with the Ottoman army in Sulukh, Mush.  Kevork Chavush escaped the fighting. Two days later his body was found in Kyosabin-Bashin on May 27 under a bridge.

Balkans 

The Armenians settled between the 6th and the 11th century in the Rhodopes, Thrace and Macedonia were several thousand in number and were mostly Paulicians and Tondrakians. Later as the Ottoman Empire extended towards the Europe, a minor amount of Armenians moved along the frontiers and settled throughout the Balkans. At the time of the Balkan Wars (1912–1913) the Armenians in Bulgaria were about 35,000.

Andranik Ozanian participated in the Balkan Wars of 1912-1913, within the Bulgarian army, alongside general Garegin Nzhdeh as a commander of Armenian auxiliary troops. Andranik met revolutionist Boris Sarafov in Sofia and the two pledged themselves to work jointly for the oppressed peoples of Armenia and Macedonia. Andranik participated in the First Balkan War of 1912–1913 alongside Garegin Nzhdeh as a Chief Commander of 12th Battalion of Lozengrad Third Brigade of the Macedonian-Adrianopolitan militia under the command of Colonel Aleksandar Protogerov. His detachment consisted of 273 Armenian volunteers, which was more than half of the 531 non-Macedonian born fighters in the group.

On October 20, the Macedonian-Adrianopolitan militia and Andranik's volunteer detachment, tight circle around Edirne and surrendered Yaver Pasha's forces. On November 4, 1912, the Macedonian-Adrianopolitan militia with the support of Andranik's volunteer detachment defeated numerically exceeding Turks near Momchilgrad.

On January 6, 1913, in a small town church in Rodosto, Aleksandar Protogerov awarded all Armenian fighters for bravery. Andranik Ozanyan was honored with the Order of Bravery.

The Ottoman parliament 

The new parliament comprised 142 Turks, 60 Arabs, 25 Albanians, 23 Greeks, 12 Armenians (including four from ARF and two from Hunchaks), 5 Jews, 4 Bulgarians, 3 Serbs and 1 Vlach in the elections of 1908. The "Committee of Union and Progress" (CUP) could count on the support of about 60 deputies and became the main party.

Karekin Pastermadjian became a member of the Ottoman parliament part from the ARF deputies.  During his four years as a deputy, he worked for the railroad bill. Main object was to build railroads as soon as possible in the vilayets which were considered to be Russia's future possessions. For that reason neither France nor Germany wished to undertake it. Another fundamental object was to build those lines with American capital, which would make it possible to counteract the Russo-Franco-German policies and financial intrigues. But in spite of all efforts unable to overcome the German opposition, although, as the outcome of the struggle in connection with that bill, two ministers of public works were forced to resign their post.

The reform package 

The politics in Istanbul was centered around trying to find a solution to the demands of Arab and Armenian reformist groups. 19th century politics of Ottoman Empire dealt with the decentralize demands of the Balkan nations. The same pattern was originating from the eastern provinces. With most of the Christian population having already left the Empire after the Balkan Wars, a redefinition of Ottoman politics was in place with a greater emphasis on Islam as a binding force. The choice of this policy should also be considered as external forces (imperialists) were Christians. It was a policy of "them against us".

in 1913 Karekin Pastermadjian had taken active a part in the conferences held for the consideration of the Armenian reforms. He was in Paris and the Netherlands, as the delegate of the ARF, to meet the inspectors general who were invited to carry out the reforms.

The reform package was signed in February 1914, between the Ottoman Empire represented by Grand Vezir Said Halim Pasha and Russia. L. C. Westenenk, an administrator for the Dutch East Indies, and Major Hoff, a major in the Norwegian Army, were selected as the first two inspectors. Hoff was in Van when the war broke out, just as Westenenk was preparing to depart for his post in Erzerum.

Committee of Union and Progress's position 
Once in power, the Committee of Union and Progress introduced a number of new initiatives intended to promote the modernization of the Ottoman Empire. CUP advocated a program of orderly reform under a strong central government, as well as the exclusion of all foreign influence. CUP promoted industrialization and administrative reforms. Administrative reforms of provincial administration quickly led to a higher degree of centralization.

Activities (Russian Empire)

Edict on Armenian church property 1903-1904 

The tsar's Russification programme reached its peak with the decree of June 12, 1903, confiscating the property of the Armenian Church. Mkrtich Khrimian (Catholicos of Armenia) revolted against the tsar. When the Tsar refused to back down the Armenians turned to the ARF. The Armenian clergy had previously been very wary of the ARF, condemning their socialism as anti-clerical. However, ARF acquired significant support and sympathy in Russian administration. Mainly because of the ARF's attitude to the Ottoman Empire, the party enjoyed the support of the central Russian administration, as tsarist and ARF foreign policy had the same alignment until 1903. The edict on Armenian church property was faced by strong ARF opposition, because it perceived a tsarist threat to Armenian national existence. In 1904, the Dashnak congress specifically extended their programme to support the rights of Armenians in the Russian Empire as well as Ottoman Turkey.

As a result, the ARF leadership decided to actively defend Armenian churches. The ARF formed a Central Committee for Self-Defence in the Caucasus and organised a series of protests. At Gandzak the Russian army responded by firing into the crowd, killing ten, and further demonstrations were met with more bloodshed. The Dashnaks and Hunchaks began a campaign of assassination against tsarist officials in Transcaucasia and they succeeded in wounding Prince Golitsin. The events convinced Tsar Nicholas that he must reverse his policies. He replaced Golitsin with the Armenophile governor Count Illarion Ivanovich Vorontsov-Dashkov and returned the property of the Armenian Church. Gradually order was restored and the Armenian bourgeoisie once more began to distance itself from the revolutionary nationalists.

Armenian-Azeri massacres 1904-1905 

Unrest in Transcaucasia, which also included major strikes, reached a climax with the widespread uprisings throughout the Russian Empire known as the 1905 Revolution. 1905 saw a wave of mutinies, strikes and peasant uprisings across imperial Russia and events in Transcaucasia were particularly violent. In Baku, the centre of the Russian oil industry, class tensions mixed with ethnic rivalries. The city was almost wholly composed of Azeris and Armenians, but the Armenian middle-class tended to have a greater share in the ownership of the oil companies and Armenian workers generally had better salaries and working conditions than the Azeris. In December 1904, after a major strike was declared in Baku, the two communities began fighting each other on the streets and the violence spread to the countryside.

Tribune of People, 1912 
In January 1912, a total of 159 Armenians were charged with membership of an anti-"Revolutionary" organisation. During the revolution Armenian revolutionaries were split into "Old Dashnaks", allied with the Kadets and "Young Dashnaks" aligned with the SRs. To determine the position of Armenians all forms of Armenian national movement put into trial. The entire Armenian intelligentsia, including writers, physicians, lawyers, bankers, and even merchants" on trial. When the tribune finished its work, 64 charges were dropped and the rest were either imprisoned or exiled for varying periods

Activities during World War I 

Beginning at the end of July and ending on August 2, 1914, the Armenian congress at Erzurum was a watershed event between the Ottoman government (Committee of Union and Progress) and Ottoman Armenian citizens. The conversation between groups were established with the Armenian liaisons Simon Vratsian, Arshak Vramian, Rostom (Stepan Zorian), and E. Aknouni (Khatchatour Maloumian) and Ottoman liaisons Dr. Behaeddin Shakir, Omer Naji (Omer Naci), and Hilmi Bey, also accompanied by an international entourage of peoples from the Caucasus. Committee of Union and Progress requested from Ottoman Armenians to facilitate the conquest of Transcaucasia by inciting a rebellion (with the Russian Armenians) against the tsarist army in the event of a Caucasus Campaign. The Ottoman plan was to draw the Persians, Kurds, Tatars and Georgians into a holy war against the Allies.  In order to carry this project it was necessary to make sure that Armenian geographical position would not hamper cooperation between these races. If this agreement went forward and the Ottoman Armenians did not support the Russians, they would be offered autonomy. This offer was one step forward from Armenian reform package, which was already established in February 1914.  The Tsar promised autonomy for Russian Armenia. A representative meeting of Russian Armenians assembled in Tiflis, Caucasus, during August 1914. The Tsar promised autonomy to six Turkish Armenian vilayets as well as the two Russian-Armenian provinces. Tsar asked Armenian's loyalty and support for Russia in the conflict. The proposal was agreed upon and nearly 20,000 Armenians, Armenian volunteer units, served with the Russian colors. The Armenians were quite willing to remain loyal to their government, but declared their inability to agree to the other proposal, that of inciting their compatriots under Russian rule to insurrection. In spite of these promises and threats, the executive committee of the ARF informed the Turks that the Armenians could not accept the Turkish proposal, and on their behalf advised the Turks not to participate in the present war, which would be very disastrous to the Turks themselves.

Armed movement 
The Russian Armenian Volunteer Corps was a military fighting unit within the Imperial Russian Army. Composed of several groups at battalion strength, its ranks were exclusively made up of Armenians from the Russian Empire, though there were also a number of Armenian from the Ottoman Empire. In August 1914, following Germany's declaration of war against Russia, Count Illarion Vorontsov-Dashkov, the Russian viceroy of the Caucasus, approached Armenian leaders in the Tiflis to broach the idea of a formation of a separate fighting corps. His offer was received warmly and within a few weeks Armenian volunteers began to enlist. Responsibility for its formation was given to a special committee created by the Armenian National Council, which coordinated its activities from Tiflis, Yerevan and Alexandrapol.

Initial 

In November 1914, Drastamat Kanayan had the 2nd battalion of the Armenian volunteers. At the Bergmann Offensive, the 2nd battalion of the Armenian volunteers engaged in battle for the first time, near Bayazid. In the course of a bloody combat which lasted twenty-four hours, commander of the battalion, was seriously wounded. From that day to March of the following year, Drastamat Kanayan remained in critical condition.

The Battle of Sarikamish took place from December 22, 1914, to January 17, 1915, as part of the Caucasus Campaign. The Ottomans employed a strategy which demanded that their troops be highly mobile and to arrive at specified objectives at precise times. Along the Kars Oblast, the 3rd battalion commanded by Hamazasp (Srvandztian) and 4th battalion by Keri (Arshak Gavafian) operated on the front facing Erzurum between Sarikamish and Oltu. 4th battalion of the Armenian volunteers engaged at Barduz Pass. The Ottoman army suffered a delay of 24 hours in the Barduz Pass, and 4th battalion of the Armenian volunteers lost 600 troops in a battle there.

On December 16, 1914, the Ottoman Empire dismantled the Armenian reform package, just after the first engagement of the Caucasus Campaign the Bergmann Offensive. On the other side, the Tsar visited the Caucasus front on December 30, 1914, telling the head of the Armenian Church that "a most brilliant future awaits the Armenians".

The first year 

Between April 15–18 of 1915, the brigade of Armenian volunteers under the command of Andranik valiantly participated in the Battle of Dilman of the Persian Campaign.

Drastamat Kanayan though remained in critical condition, his battalion led into eleven battles in the neighborhood of Alashkert, Toutakh, and Malashkert, until Drastamat Kanayan recovered and returned to resume the command.

The Red Sunday the leaders of the Armenian community were arrested and moved to two holding centers near Ankara upon the order of the Minister of the Interior Mehmed Talaat Bey of April 24, 1915. Mehmed Talaat Bey gave the detention order on April 24, 1915, which commenced at 8 p.m. by Chief of Police of Constantinople Bedri Bey.

Hampartsoum Boyadjian, a Hunchakian, was among the first to be arrested in April 1915 at Red Sunday.  After a trial in July, he was hanged on 24 August 1915, with 12 comrades.

On May 6, 1915, Andranik was the commanding officer of the first Armenian volunteer detachment (about 1,200 soldiers), which helped lift the Siege of Van. Theodore G. Chernozubov for the successes of Andranik in Ashnaka, Vrush-Khoran, Khanika, Kotur, Saray, Molla-Hasan, Belenjik and Garateli stated significantly associated with the fighting of the 1st Armenian volunteers, headed by Andranik. Chernozubov praised Andranik as a brave and experienced chief, who well understood the combat situation, described him as always at the head of militia, enjoying great prestige among the volunteers.

On June 15, 1915, The Twenty Martyrs from Hunchakian leaders, after spending two years in terrible conditions in Ottoman prisons, and undergoing lengthy mock trials, twenty prominent figures - Paramaz, Dr. Benne, Aram Ach'ekbashian, Vanig and others were sentenced to death by hanging. All twenty men were hanged in the central square of Constantinople, known as Sultan Bayazid Square. Paramaz's last words before his hanging were: 

In July 1915, Khetcho (Catchik), Karekin Pastermadjian's assistant and commander, died on the shores of Lake Van

The second year 

The biggest achievement of the first year was the Armenian governing of the Administration for Western Armenia, (Republic of Van)  with Aram Manukian as the head. The Republic of Van was a temporary Armenian provisional government between 1915 and 1918. It was also briefly referred as Free Vaspurakan.

Andranik commanded a battalion that defeated Halil Pasha during the Battle of Bitlis in 1916.

Negotiations with the French for returning Armenian refugees to their homes in Cilicia were performed with leadership of Boghos Nubar. Negotiations were directed by Quai d'Orsay which is a metonymy to French Ministry Foreign Affairs. Foreign Minister Aristide Briand seized this opportunity to provide troops for French commitment made in Sykes-Picot Agreement, which was still secret at the time. Armenian leadership also meet with Sir Mark Sykes and Georges Picot. The Legion (force) was established officially in Cairo, Egypt in November 1916. The force named as French Armenian Legion and planned under the command of General Edmund Allenby. However, beginning with 1917 and not in the original agreement, this Armenian force fought in Palestine, Syria.

The third year 

The February Revolution of 1917 caused chaos among Russian soldiers in the Caucasus Front and by the end of that year most Russian soldiers left the front and returned to their homes. In July 1917 six Armenian regiments were created in the Caucasus Front with support of Armenian organizations in Petrograd and Tiflis. As of October 1917 two Armenian divisions were already created, with Tovmas Nazarbekian at their head. As of early 1918 only few thousand Armenian volunteers under the command of two hundred officers opposed the Turkish offenses.

In the spring of 1917, Karekin Pastermadjian and Dr. Hakob Zavriev, was sent from the Caucasus to Petrograd to negotiate with the temporary Russian government concerning Caucasian affairs. Karekin Pastermadjian left for America in June 1917 as the representative of the Armenian National Council of Tiflis and as the special envoy of the Catholicos of all the Armenians.

On December 5, 1917, the armistice of Erzincan was signed between the Russians and Ottomans, ending armed conflicts between the two states. After the Bolshevik seizure of power, a multinational congress of Transcaucasian representatives met to create a provisional regional executive body known as Transcaucasian Seim.

Last year 

In 1918, the Russian authorities made Andranik a Major General and decorated him six times for gallantry, the source stated as general Antranik as a command of the Armenian and Russian forces against those of the Turks; was in 59 engagements, several horses shot under him but kept fighting after the czar's army collapsed.

The roots of the first national republic was achieved by the Armenians under Russian control which devised a national congress in October 1917. The convention in Tiflis was concluded in September 1917 with delegates from former Romanov realm (203), which 103 belonged to the ARF. On March 3, 1918, the Russians followed the armistice of Erzincan with the Treaty of Brest-Litovsk, and left the war, with territorial losses. From March 14 to April 1918, when a conference was held between the Ottoman Empire and the delegation of the Seim. When the first Republic of Armenia (First Republic of Armenia) was proclaimed in 1918, the ARF became the ruling party.

Between March and April 1918 Andranik was the governor of the Administration for Western Armenia.

Karekin Pastermadjian was assigned as the ambassador of the First Republic of Armenia to the United States in Washington, D.C.

The original plan for the Armenian army was to consist of Tovmas Nazarbekian's 60,000 soldiers with Andranik Pasha's 30,000 fedayees. However after the splitting of the Transcaucasian Democratic Federative Republic, the Ottoman Empire had taken Alexandropol and were intent on eliminating the center of Armenian resistance based in Yerevan. After the formation of the First Republic of Armenia in May 1918 Andranik fought alongside volunteer units to combat the Ottoman army. The Armenians were able to prevent total elimination and delivered crushing blows to the Turkish army in the battles of Sardarapat, Karakilisa and Abaran. The First Republic of Armenia had to sign the Treaty of Batum, which was signed in Batum on June 4, 1918. It was the ADR's first treaty.

After the Ottoman Empire took vast swathes of territory and imposed harsh conditions, the new republic was left with 10,000 square kilometers. Andranik's military leadership was instrumental in allowing the Armenian population of Van to escape the Ottoman Army and flee to Eastern Armenia.

By July inter ethnic warfare had started in Zangezur. Armenian couriers dispatched to Yerevan pleaded for officers and materiel. The Republic couldn't support irregular forces fighting in the south. At the critical moment General Andranik arrived in Zangezur with an irregular division estimated with about 3 to 5 thousand men and 40,000 refugees and the occupied provinces of Russian Armenia. As the commander of Armenian forces in Nakhichivan Autonomous Republic, Andranik has declared that his army is determined to continue the war against Ottoman Empire. His activities were concentrated at the link between the Ottoman Empire and the Azerbaijan Democratic Republic at Karabakh, Nakhchivan, and Zangezur.

Andranik and his troops were 40 km (25 mi) from Shusha, the most important city of Karabakh at the time, in early December 1918. Just before the Armistice of Mudros was signed, Andranik was on the way from Zangezur to Shusha, to control the main city of Karabakh. In January 1919 Armenian troops advancing, the British general William M. Thomson gave Andranik assurances that a favorable treaty would be reached at the Paris Peace Conference of 1919.

On July 26, 1918, the Centrocaspian Dictatorship was a short-lived anti-Soviet client state proclaimed in Baku, forged by the Mensheviks and the ARF, this unrecognized state replaced the Bolshevik Baku Commune in a bloodless coup d'état.

The Baku forces mainly commanded by Colonel Avetisov. Under his command were about 6,000 Centrocaspian Dictatorship troops of the Baku Army. The vast majority of the troops in this force were Armenians, though there were some Russians among them. Their artillery comprised some 40 field guns. Most of the Baku Soviet troops and practically all their officers were Armenians of ARF affiliation. Centrocaspian Dictatorship fell on September 15, 1918, when the Ottoman-Azerbaijani forces took control of Baku.

Path to Unified Armenia 

On October 30, the Armistice of Moudros ended the hostilities in the Middle Eastern theatre between the Ottoman Empire and the Allies of World War I. It also concluded the Caucasus Campaign for the Ottoman Empire. By the end of the war, the Ottoman Empire, although it lost the Persian Campaign, Sinai and Palestine Campaign and Mesopotamian Campaign, it had re-captured all the territory which was lost to the Russians. At this point Ottomans finalized on December 5, 1917, the armistice of Erzincan, on March 3, 1918 Treaty of Brest-Litovsk, on March 14 Trabzon peace conference and on June 4, 1918, Treaty of Batum.

In 1919, Avetis Aharonyan was the head of the Armenian delegation at the Paris Peace Conference with Boghos Nubar. In late 1919 Andranik led a delegation to the United States to lobby its support for a mandate for Armenia. He was accompanied by General Jaques Bagratuni, Captain Haig Bonapartian, and Lieutenant Ter-Pogossian. In Fresno he directed a campaign in which he raised $500,000 for the relief of Armenian war refugees.

Avetis Aharonyan signed the Treaty of Sèvres formulating the "Wilsonian Armenia" in direct collaboration with the Armenian Diaspora.  The Treaty of Sèvres was signed between the Allied and Associated Powers and Ottoman Empire at Sèvres, France on August 10, 1920. The treaty included a clause on Armenia: it made all parties signing the treaty recognize Armenia as a free and independent state. The drawing of definite borders was, however, left to President Woodrow Wilson and the United States State Department, and was only presented to Armenia on November 22. Wilsonian Armenia refers to the boundary configuration of the Armenian state in the Treaty of Sèvres, drawn by Woodrow Wilson.

Activities during Interwar period

Territorial disputes of Armenia 

On September 24 and the Turkish–Armenian War began.
Negotiations were then carried out between Karabekir and a peace delegation led by Alexander Khatisian in Alexandropol; although Karabekir’s terms were extremely harsh the Armenian delegation had little recourse but to agree to them. The Treaty of Alexandropol was thus signed on December 3, 1920, after the Armenian government had fallen to a concurrent Soviet invasion on December 2.

Azerbaijan claimed most of the territory Armenia was sitting on, demanding all or most parts of the former Russian provinces of Elizavetpol, Tiflis, Yerevan, Kars and Batum. Territorial clashes between Armenia and Azerbaijan took place throughout 1919 and 1920, most notably in the regions of Nakhichevan, Karabakh and Syunik (Zangezur).

In May 1919, Dro led an expeditionary unit that was successful in establishing Armenian administrative control in Nakhichevan

Sovietization & exile of Armenian leaders 

However, despite ARF's tight grip on power Drastamat Kanayan (Ministry of Defense) and Aram Manukian (Ministry of Interior), the ARF was unable to stop the impending Communist invasion of the First Republic of Armenia from the north, which culminated with a Soviet takeover in 1920. There was also a large movement of Armenian communists who aided the Soviet control. The 11th Red Army began its virtually unopposed advance into Armenia on November 29, 1920.

The actual transfer of power took place on December 2 in Yerevan. The Armenian leadership approved an ultimatum, presented to it by the Soviet plenipotentiary Boris Legran. Armenia decided to join the Soviet sphere. The ARF was banned, its leaders exiled and many of its members dispersed to other parts of the world.

Daniel Bek-Pirumyan was arrested and executed by the Bolsheviks in Karakilisa in 1921. In 1937 during the Joseph Stalin's Great Purge against the military and other suspected enemies, his secret police arrested Movses Silikyan, Christophor Araratov, Dmitry Mirimanov, Aghasi Varosyan, Stepan Ohanesyan, Hakob Mkrtchyan, and Harutyun Hakobyan imprisoned and finally executed in Nork gorge. Aghbalyan moved to Lebanon, directed Nshan Palanjian seminarium in Beirut.

The Treaty of Kars was signed on October 13, 1921, and ratified in Yerevan on September 11, 1922. Treaty established contemporary borders between Turkey and the South Caucasus states on the count of Armenian lands. Armenian Minister of Foreign Affairs Askanaz Mravian and Minister of Interior Poghos Makintsian signed the Treaty of Kars, which helped to conclude (for the moment) the territorial disputes originate after the Caucasus Campaign as a whole.

Cilicia and French Armenian Legion 

In January 1920, Turkish National Movement advanced his troops into Marash where the Battle of Marash ensued against the French Armenian Legion. The battle resulted in the massacres of 5,000 – 12,000 Armenians, spelling the end of the remaining Armenian population in the region.

France disbanded the French Armenian Legion shortly after the war started. One of the Armenian Legion members, Sarkis Torossian, wrote in his diary that he suspected the French forces gave weapons and ammunition to the Kemalists to allow the French army safe passage out of Cilicia.

The Cilicia Peace Treaty between France and the Turkish National Movement was signed on 9 March 1921. It was intended to end the Franco-Turkish war, but failed to do so and was replaced in October 1921 with the Treaty of Ankara.

Republic of Mountainous Armenia, 1922 
On 18 February 1921, the ARF led an anti-Soviet rebellion in Yerevan and seized power. The ARF controlled Yerevan and the surrounding regions for almost 42 days before being defeated by the numerically superior Red Army troops later in April 1921. The leaders of the rebellion then retreated into the Syunik region. On 26 April 1921, the 2nd Pan-Zangezurian congress, held in Tatev, announced the independence of the self-governing regions of Daralakyaz (Vayots Dzor), Zangezur, and Mountainous Artsakh, under the name of the Republic of Mountainous Armenia and later on 1 June 1921, it was renamed the Republic of Armenia.

After months of fierce battles with the Red Army, the Republic of Mountainous Armenia capitulated in July 1921 following Soviet Russia's promises to keep the mountainous region as a part of Soviet Armenia. After losing the battle, Garegin Nzhdeh, his soldiers, and many prominent Armenian intellectuals, including leaders of the first Independent Republic of Armenia, crossed the border into neighbouring Persian city of Tabriz.

Operation Nemesis

Achievements of the movement

Establishment of an Armenian State 

The First Republic of Armenia was the first modern establishment of an Armenian state. The leaders of the government came from mainly the Armenian Revolutionary Federation and also other Armenian political parties who helped create the new republic. State had unquestionably Armenian color, as when it was declared out of 2,000,000 Armenian's (Russian) in the Caucasus, 1,300,000 (Russian) Armenians were to be found within the boundaries of the new Republic of Armenia, which also had 300,000 to 350,000 refugees that escaped from the Ottoman Empire. Added to this Armenian population were 350,000 to 400,000 people of other nationalities. There were 1,650,000 Armenians (both Russian, and Ottoman origin) of the 2,000,000 people within the borders of the new Republic which made clearly, uncontested, an Armenian state.

Richard G. Hovannisian explains the conditions of the resistance:

Cultural heritage 
There is a Fedayees museum in Yerevan named after General Andranik Ozanian. Armenian resistance has left a symbolic dish. The "Harissa (dish)": is generally served to commemorate the Musa Dagh resistance.

Timeline of the movement 

The timeline covers the activities of ethnic Armenian citizens of the Ottoman Empire, Russian Empire and significant European cities which had significant Armenian diaspora, such as in France as early as the 1890s. The timeline has events formulated by Social Democrat Hunchakian Party, Armenakan, Armenian Revolutionary Federation, and Armenian Patriotic Society of Europe.

The "liberation movement" as the term implies an "Armenian nationalistic movement aimed to "liberate" the Armenian people from the domination of Ottoman and Russian powers as explained under the "Russian Armenia" (1828–1918), "Armenians in the Ottoman Empire" (not the period (1453 to 1829) but (1830 -1922)) and also Armenian controlled (established or being part of) "Republic of Van" (1915-1918),"Transcaucasian Democratic Federative Republic" (1917-1918), "First Republic of Armenia", (1918–1922) and "Centrocaspian Dictatorship" (1918).

The events under the Armenian Soviet Socialist Republic is not covered.

References
Notes

Footnotes

Citations

See also
First Nagorno-Karabakh War
Nagorno-Karabakh conflict
Military history of Armenia

 
19th-century conflicts
20th-century conflicts
19th century in Armenia
20th century in Armenia
Armenian nationalism
Modern history of Armenia
National liberation movements